Robert Mayne  (1724–1782) was a British merchant, banker and politician who sat in the House of Commons from 1774 to 1782.
 
Mayne was the fifth son of William Mayne of Powis Logie, Clackmannanshire and his second wife Helen Galbraith, daughter of William Galbraith of Balgair, Stirling. He married Anne Knight, daughter of John Knight on 24 October 1763. By 1770 he was a banker in Jermyn St and traded under various partnerships. He married as his second wife Sarah Otway, daughter of Francis Otway on 15 June 1775.

In 1774 Mayne's brother Sir William Mayne acquired control of both seats at Gatton. Robert Mayne was returned to replace his brother as Member of Parliament for Gatton at a by-election on 27 December 1774. While in Parliament he was also a major Government contractor provisioning  troops in America or the West Indies with contracts from 1776 to  1782. In the 1780 general election he contested Stockbridge and Colchester where he was unsuccessful but was also returned again for Gatton. He supported the Administration of Lord North and is not recorded as having spoken in Parliament.

Mayne's business went bankrupt in 1782, and he committed suicide on  5 August 1782.

External links
 Philip Mould Historical Portraits Mrs Robert Mayne by Joshua Reynolds

References

1724 births
1782 deaths
People from Clackmannanshire
British bankers
British MPs 1774–1780
British MPs 1780–1784
Members of the Parliament of Great Britain for English constituencies
Suicides in the United Kingdom